Vivaldi is a surname. Notable people with the surname include:

Angel Vivaldi (born 1985), American musician
Antonio Vivaldi (1678–1741), Italian composer
Juan Manuel Vivaldi (born 1979), Argentine field hockey player
María Teresa Martín-Vivaldi (born 1955), Spanish painter
Ugolino Vivaldi (fl. 1291), Genovese explorer
Ugolino Vivaldi Pasqua (1885–1910), Italian aviator
Vandino Vivaldi (fl. 1291), Genovese explorer

See also
Vivaldi (disambiguation)

Italian-language surnames